Tom Connors may refer to:

 Stompin' Tom Connors (1936–2013), Canadian country and folk singer-songwriter
 Tom Connors (research scientist) (1934–2002), British cancer research scientist